Royal Copenhagen, officially the Royal Porcelain Factory, is a Danish manufacturer of porcelain products and was founded in Copenhagen in 1775 under the protection of Danish Dowager Queen Juliane Marie. It is recognized by its factory mark, the three wavy lines above each other, symbolizing Denmark's three straits: Storebælt, Lillebælt and Øresund.

Early years

Starting in the 17th century, Europeans, long fascinated by the blue and white porcelain exported from China during the Ming and Qing dynasties, began to imitate the precious ware. The Royal Copenhagen manufactory's operations began in a converted post office in 1775. It was founded by chemist Frantz Heinrich Müller who was given a 50-year monopoly to create porcelain. Though royal patronage was not at first official, the first pieces manufactured were dining services for the royal family. When, in 1779, King Christian VII assumed financial responsibility, the manufactory was styled the Royal Porcelain Factory.

The factory's pattern No. 1, still in production, is "Musselmalet", "mussel-painted", called "Blue Fluted" in English-speaking countries. The "mussel blue" is cobalt. The  discovery in 1772 of a rich vein of cobalt in Norway, the junior part of the joint kingdom, was quickly developed using some nearby water power into an industry, grinding cobalt to a fine dust to incorporate in ceramic glazes and glass manufacture. The mellowed Blaafarveværket site is a tourist attraction today. During the first half of the 19th century cobalt rivaled fisheries as the greatest source of wealth obtained from Norway. Many of the German porcelain manufactories in the 19th century produced a version of intense blue "echt Kobalt" decor combined with patterned gilding, using the Norwegian cobalt from Denmark.

In 1790, Royal Copenhagen was commissioned by the king to produce a "Flora Danica" dinner service, with gilded edges and botanical motifs copied from the ongoing illustrated Flora Danica. It was intended as a gift for Catherine the Great; Royal Copenhagen has produced hand-painted pieces of "Flora Danica" to this day.

In 1851, Royal Copenhagen showed its production at The Great Exhibition in London. In 1868, as a result of royal companies' privatization, the Royal Porcelain Factory came into private hands, though the "Royal" designation was retained. 

In the mid-19th century the many large European porcelain companies generally stood aloof from artistic developments such as Japonisme, and the Arts and Crafts movement, concentrating on tableware, and often struggling to throw off what had become the deadening influence of Rococo and Neoclassical styles.  In the 1870s most continued to produce an eclectic variety of revivalist styles, though sometimes experimenting with glazes, as at Meissen porcelain, which began to produce monochrome vases from 1883.

The first major porcelain company to seriously change its styles was Royal Copenhagen, which made radical changes from 1883, when it was bought by Aluminia, an earthenware company. Arnold Krog, an architect under 30 with no practical experience of the industry, was made artistic director the next year, and rapidly shifted designs in the same directions art pottery was exploring, commissioning many painters to design for the factory. Japanese influences were initially very strong. The new wares soon won prizes at various international exhibitions, and most of the large porcelain makers began to move in similar directions, causing problems for the smaller art potteries.

Shortly after Aluminia's acquisition, Royal Copenhagen production was moved to a modern factory building at Aluminia's site in Frederiksberg, on the outskirts of Copenhagen. At the Exposition Universelle (1889) in Paris, Royal Copenhagen won the Grand Prix, giving it international exposure.

Current company
In recent years, Royal Copenhagen acquired Georg Jensen in 1972, incorporated with Holmegaard Glass Factory in 1985, and finally Bing & Grøndahl in 1987. Royal Copenhagen was a part of a group of Scandinavian companies, Royal Scandinavia, together with Georg Jensen, and was owned by a Danish private equity fund, Axcel. Following Axcel's acquisition of Royal Scandinavia, Holmegaard Glasværk was sold in a MBO, and a controlling interest in the Swedish glass works Orrefors Kosta Boda was sold to New Wave Group.

In December 2012, Axcel sold Royal Copenhagen to the Finnish listed company Fiskars, which was founded in 1649.

The company now produces its products in Thailand.

Patterns (original manufacturer in parentheses)

Most famous
Flora Danica, Musselmalet (Blue Fluted), Blue Flower, Henriette, Saxon Flower, Fan, Gemina, and Gemma (Royal Copenhagen)
 Empire, Offenbach, Butterfly and Seagull (Bing & Grøndahl)
 Tranquebar and Blue Line (Aluminia).

New and currently in production
Blue Fluted Plain (1775, revised in 1885),
White Fluted (1775),
Blue Fluted Mega (2000),
Black Fluted Mega (2006),
Princess (1978),
Blue Fluted Half Lace (1888),
Blue Fluted Full Lace (1775, revised in 1885),
blomst (-),
Hav (2019),
White Elements (2008),
Blue Elements (2011),
Multicoloured Elements (2008),
Star Fluted Christmas (2006),
Flora (2012),
Blue Palmette (2004),
White Fluted Half Lace,
Flora Danica (1790)

Discontinued
 Blue Flower, Gemina, Gemma, Jingle Bells, Blue Line, Frijsenborg and Julian Marie (Royal Copenhagen)
 Seagull, Blue Henning Koppel, White Henning Koppel, Tema, Mexico (Bing & Grøndahl)

Collectables 

 Royal Copenhagen 2010 plaquettes: Numbered and named cobalt blue decorated plates depicted a variety of scenes, holidays, years, and occasions. Most commonly round, they measured about 8 cm (3-1/4") in diameter, with a blue scene on white background.
 Larger, approximately 18.5 cm, blue on white cobalt blue decorated plates, created annually for Mother's Day, the Olympics and other commemorations. Some weren't annual issues, instead depicted scenes. In 1895, Royal Copenhagen began producing annual Christmas plates, and continue to do so.
 Porcelein pipes, beginning in 1969 and manufactured for about 15 years.

Christmas plates
The tradition of Christmas plates started hundreds of years ago in Europe, when wealthy people presented their servants with cakes and sweets, served on decorative plates of wood or metal at Christmas time. The servants referred to these gifts as their Christmas Plate. In 1895 Bing & Grøndahl produced the first Christmas plate made from porcelain, with the date inscribed, and has made one each year since. In 1908 the Royal Copenhagen factory followed suit. Each year these plates are made in limited quantities and have been collectable for over 100 years. Each plate is made in the year of issue only, after which the mould is destroyed, and the design is never made again.

The themes since 1908 are:

Further reading
 Bojesen, Benedicte, and Steen Nottelmann. Royal Copenhagen Art, Industry. Lyngby: Sophienholm, 1996.  
 Christoffersen, Lars. Christmas Plates & Other Commemoratives from Royal Copenhagen and Bing & Grøndahl. A Schiffer book for collectors. Atglen, PA: Schiffer Pub, 2004.  Table of contents
 Heritage, Robert J. Royal Copenhagen Porcelain Animals and Figurines. A Schiffer book for collectors. Atglen, PA: Schiffer Pub, 1997.  
 Kongelige Porcelainsfabrik, Bredo L. Grandjean, Dyveke Helsted, and Merete Bodelsen. The Royal Copenhagen Porcelain Manufactory 1775-1975. Copenhagen: The Manufactory, [eksp., Amagertorv 6], 1975. 
 Pope, Caroline, and Nick Pope. A Collector's Guide to Royal Copenhagen Porcelain. A Schiffer book for collectors. Atglen, PA: Schiffer, 2001.  
 Wagner, Peter, Steen Nottelmann, Finn Andersen, and Paul Nesbitt. Flora Danica. Edinburgh: Royal Botanic Garden, Edinburgh, 1994.  
 Winstone, H. V. F. Royal Copenhagen. [London]: Stacey International, 1984.

See also
Porcelain manufacturing companies in Europe

References

Battie, David, ed., Sotheby's Concise Encyclopedia of Porcelain, 1990, Conran Octopus, 
Mundt, Barbara, in Hungarian Ceramics from the Zsolnay Manufactory, 1853–2001, ed. Ács, Piroska et al., 2002, Yale University Press, 9780300097047, google books

External links

 Hey, Arthur: Royal Copenhagen

 
Ceramics manufacturers of Denmark
Companies based in Frederiksberg Municipality
Danish porcelain
Danish brands
Danish sculpture
Manufacturing companies established in 1775
Danish companies established in 1775
Purveyors to the Court of Denmark
Fiskars